Happy Accidents may refer to:
 Happy Accidents (film), starring Marisa Tomei and Vincent D'Onofrio
 Happy Accidents (album), a 1990 album by the Doughboys 
 Happy Accidents (band), an English pop punk band.
 Happy Accidents, a 2011 book by actress Jane Lynch
 Happy Accidents, a 1989 episode of Shining Time Station.
 Happy Accident, a 1998 album by The Albion Band
"Happy Accidents", a song by Saint Motel from Saintmotelevision
 ″Happy little accidents″, catch-phrase of painter Bob Ross
 Serendipity, a fortunate happenstance or pleasant surprise